Apostolove Raion  was a raion (district) of Dnipropetrovsk Oblast, southeastern-central Ukraine. Its administrative centre was located at the town of Apostolove. The raion was abolished on 18 July 2020 as part of the administrative reform of Ukraine, which reduced the number of raions of Dnipropetrovsk Oblast to seven. The area of Apostolove Raion was merged into Kryvyi Rih Raion.

At the time of disestablishment, the raion consisted of four hromadas:
 Apostolove urban hromada with the administration in Apostolove;
 Hrushivka rural hromada with the administration in the selo of Hrushivka;
 Nyva Trudova rural hromada with the administration in the selo of Nyva Trudova;
 Zelenodolsk urban hromada with the administration in the city of Zelenodolsk.

References

Former raions of Dnipropetrovsk Oblast
1923 establishments in Ukraine
Ukrainian raions abolished during the 2020 administrative reform